Jarosław Nowicki (born 11 January 1961 in Warsaw) is a retired Polish football player.

He began his career in Zawisza Bydgoszcz and later played in Poland for ŁKS, Jagiellonia and Lechia. He won the NSL Cup in 1991 with Parramatta Eagles.

He represented Poland at 1978 UEFA European Under-18 Football Championship and 1979 FIFA World Youth Championship. He played four times for senior national team, scoring his only goal against Japan on 25 January 1981.

Since 2006, he has been working for International Management Group as a football agent. In 2010, he co-founded the football management agency Sport Trade Center.

References

External links
 Lechia Gdańsk profile
 Jarek Nowicki at Aussie Footballers
 

1961 births
Living people
Polish footballers
Polish expatriate footballers
Poland youth international footballers
Poland international footballers
Zawisza Bydgoszcz players
Jagiellonia Białystok players
Ekstraklasa players
ŁKS Łódź players
Lechia Gdańsk players
Parramatta FC players
Wollongong United FC players
Expatriate soccer players in Australia
Footballers from Warsaw
Association football wingers